Stephanie Sengupta (also credited as Stephanie SenGupta or Stéphanie Sengupta) is an American television producer and writer. She is a co-creator of the series Reign and known for writing and co-producing episodes of the police procedural dramas Hawaii Five-0, Law & Order and Law & Order: Criminal Intent, and for foreign adaptations of the Law & Order franchise.

Biography
She is of mixed Bengali Indian and French-American descent.  Her father is from Kolkata, West Bengal, India, while her mother is American, with French ancestry.

Filmography

References

External links
 

American Hindus
American people of Bengali descent
American people of French descent
American women writers of Indian descent
Tisch School of the Arts alumni
American television producers
American women television producers
American television writers
Bengali writers
Living people
Year of birth missing (living people)
American screenwriters of Indian descent
American women television writers
American women screenwriters
Carleton College alumni